Etienne-Jean Delécluze (26 February 1781 – 12 July 1863) was a French painter and critic.

From 1797 on, he was a pupil of Jacques-Louis David, as he describes in his biography of David. 
As one of his favorite pupils, he was invited to David's last meal in France before going to Brussels in 1816.
From 1822 on, he worked as a critic for the Journal des débats.

His book Louis David, son école et son temps (Paris, 1857) was quite politically controversial, and he had to rewrite it in order to restore his reputation.

He was a maternal uncle of Eugène Viollet-le-Duc and in charge of Viollet-le-Duc's education for some time.

References

External links

 
 

18th-century French painters
French male painters
19th-century French painters
1781 births
1863 deaths
Pupils of Jacques-Louis David
18th-century French male artists